William J. Lee (December 15, 1925 – October 30, 2014) was an American politician. He served as a Democratic member of the Georgia House of Representatives from 1956 to 1999.

References

1925 births
2014 deaths
Democratic Party members of the Georgia House of Representatives
People from Forest Park, Georgia
20th-century American politicians